Harano Sur is a 1957 Indian Bengali-language romantic drama film by Ajoy Kar, starring Suchitra Sen and Uttam Kumar, with music by Hemant Kumar, and sung by Geeta Dutt. This is the first film that Uttam had produced along with Ajoy Kar. The film is regarded as one of the finest examples of Bengali cinema of this early period. The film is based on the 1942 American film Random Harvest. The film became a huge success at the box office.

The legendary Suchitra Sen and Uttam Kumar– that’s what this movie is all about. It’s simply their charisma, their chemistry, their presence which will captivate you throughout. As per the narrative, Uttam Kumar becomes an amnesiac following a train accident and meets a doctor played by Suchitra Sen. They fall in love and eventually tie the knot, but soon Uttam recovers his lost memory after another accident. He then returns to his old life, leaving Suchitra but she visits Calcutta in search of her husband. Uttam fails to recognize her. Isn’t it an intriguing storyline? The climax is even better! 

The film became an all time blockbuster and the highest grossing Bengali film of 1957

Synopsis 

An amnesiac after a train accident, Alok Mukherjee (Uttam Kumar) is rescued on escaping from the asylum where he is admitted by Doctor Roma Banerjee (Suchitra Sen) who takes him to her father's (Pahadi Sanyal) country house in a village called Palaspur. There, while treating him she falls for him and he for her. They marry but a second accident makes him recall his life as a rich businessman in Calcutta and forget the memories spent with Roma. Roma follows him to Calcutta and meets him there, but he doesn't recognise her. He hires her as governess to his niece instead. Roma keeps trying to simulate Alok's memory but is looked at suspiciously by Lata, Alok's fiancée in Calcutta who thinks Roma is snatching Alok away from her and who complains to Alok's mother. The latter has Roma kicked out. Alok realizing she is from Palaspur and that is where he got back his memory goes there and regains his memory of times spent with Roma there.

Cast 
Uttam Kumar as Alok Mukherjee
Suchitra Sen as Dr Roma Banerjee
Pahadi Sanyal as Roma's father
Chandrabati Devi as Alok mother
Utpal Dutta as Dr Majumder
Khagen Pathak as Station Master
Shailen Mukherjee as Manager
Haren Mukherjee as Dr. Haren Mukherjee
Dipak Mukherjee as Mihir Bhattacharya
Kajori Guha as Lata

Soundtrack 

Every song became evergreen and chartbuster hit and was one of the reasons for film's success.

Production 
Harano Sur was the first film produced by Uttam Kumar along with Ajoy Kar. Uttam decided to keep Bengali cinema to national level, so he came into film production under their banner Alochaya Production Pvt Ltd. 

There is also no doubt that Uttam and Suchitra Sen are favorite costars of each other in real life. So, Uttam chose Suchitra in lead actress role. At that time, Sen was working many films at the same time. So, her every date is very important and problematic. But Suchitra told Uttam loudly that she canceled all the dates for him. They had so much faith in the charisma of their own pair.

Release & Reception 
It was released in India on 6 September 1957 under the banner of Alochaya Production and distributed by Chayabani Private Limited. The film often regarded as one of the greatest romantic films in Bengali cinema history and one of the finest examples on early golden period. Film ran for 84 days in theater and received positive response from all over India by the critics. The film became highest grossing Bengali film in 1957.

Awards 
 1957 – Certificate of Merit for Third Best Feature Film in Bengali

References

External links 

1957 films
1957 drama films
Bengali-language Indian films
Indian drama films
Films set in Kolkata
1950s Bengali-language films
Films directed by Ajoy Kar
Indian remakes of American films